Franchise fraud is defined by the United States Federal Bureau of Investigation as a pyramid scheme.

Franchise fraud in U.S. federal law 
The FBI website states:

"pyramid schemes — also referred to as franchise fraud or chain referral schemes — are marketing and investment frauds in which an individual is offered a distributorship or franchise to market a particular product. The real profit is earned, not by the sale of the product, but by the sale of new distributorships. Emphasis on selling franchises rather than the product eventually leads to a point where the supply of potential investors is exhausted and the pyramid collapses."

In the United States, franchising is regulated by a complex web of franchise rules and franchising regulations consisting of the Federal Trade Commission Franchise Rule, state laws, and industry guidelines.

The FTC franchise rule specifies what information a franchisor must disclose to a prospective franchise business as a franchise opportunity in a document named the Franchise Disclosure Document (FDD).

Means of committing franchise fraud

Franchisors that practice franchise fraud will attempt to pressure a franchisee leaving the franchise system to sign a non-disclosure agreement, confidentiality agreement or a gag order. The gag order allows franchise misrepresentation by preventing prospective new franchisees learning important details about the churning franchise. Unfortunately, the Federal Trade Commission Rule and the State Franchise Disclosure Documents that govern the sale of franchises appear to enable franchisors to withhold negative facts concerning the performance of the franchised business plan from new buyers of franchises and to disclaim that the franchisors have promised anything in the way of success and profits in the written disclosure document and the binding, and generally non-negotiated, franchise agreement. The sellers of franchised business plans, the franchisors, themselves, appear to have no obligation under current rules and regulations to disclose negative system UNIT performance statistics to new buyers of the franchised business plans who then unknowingly purchase franchises that have demonstrated low or no profitability and high failure rates of "founding" franchisees.

Uniquely, franchisors, themselves, under the FTC Rule and the State Franchise Disclosure Documents appear not to have to disclose system UNIT Performance Statistics in their possession to new buyers, and new buyers of franchises must do their due diligence with current and ex-franchisees. Current and ex-franchisees of systems have no duty under the law to disclose information about their businesses to prospective franchisees.
 
In the 2007 Franchise Rule, in the Federal Register from pages 15505 to 15506, comments from former franchisees were listed concerning confidentiality agreements:
"commenters complained that the use of confidentiality clauses is widespread, and several commenters urged the Commission to ban the use of confidentiality clauses as a deceptive or unfair trade practice. Other opponents of confidentiality clauses—including state regulators and some franchisors—asserted that such provisions inhibit prospective franchisees from learning the truth as they conduct their due diligence investigation of a franchise offer."
"one franchisee representative, contended that the harm flowing from confidentiality provisions goes beyond individual franchise sales, noting that such provisions intimidate franchisees into not testifying before legislative committees and public agencies, such as the Federal Trade Commission."
"[T]he gag order . . . prohibits me from being able to answer questions, you know, and give cautionary remarks to other people who might be considering the franchise that I was with."
"‘‘the use of gag orders is almost 100 percent in some franchise systems."
"Three franchisees— Raymond Buckley, Roger C. Haines, and David E. Myklebust—believed that they were kept in the dark about the failure of their franchisor’s system due to confidentiality clauses imposed on current and former franchisees."
"confidentiality clauses "typically release the franchisor from legal liability and bar the franchisee (under threat of legal action) from making any oral or written statements about the franchise system or their experience with the franchised business. The purpose of such clauses is to shut down any negative public comment about the franchise system."
"franchisee, related: "I had spoken to some of the franchisees that had left the system. I now feel certain that they painted a picture that was not close to being the truth based on the gag order that [the franchisor] imposed. Had I gotten the truth from these people, my decision certainly would have been different. Every franchisee leaving the system has had a gag order placed on them, making it impossible for current and future franchisees to get the facts."

By having former franchisees under a gag order, franchisors that practice business franchise fraud or franchise churning "inhibit prospective franchisees from learning the truth about the franchising opportunity as they conduct their due diligence investigation of a franchise offer."

Franchise fraud law in the U.S. state by state

California

California Franchise Investment Law, begins at section 31000 of the California Corporations Code.
Part 1 lists the definitions of the California Franchise code.
Part 2 is the Regulation Of The Sale Of Franchises.  There are three chapters, 1) Exemptions, 2) Disclosures, and 3) General Provisions.

Under chapter 2, section 31125 the following exists

(A) The proposed modification is in connection with the resolution of a bona fide dispute between the franchisor and the franchisee or the resolution of a claimed or actual franchisee or franchisor default, and the modification is not applied on a franchise systemwide basis at or about the time the modification is executed. A modification shall not be deemed to be made on a franchise systemwide basis if it is offered on a voluntary basis to fewer than 25 percent of the franchisor's California franchises within any 12-month period.

(B) The proposed modification is offered on a voluntary basis to fewer than 25 percent of the franchisor's California franchises within any 12-month period, provided each franchisee is given a right to rescind the modification agreement if the modification is not made in compliance with paragraph (1) of subdivision (c).

(d) Any modification of a franchise agreement with an existing franchise of a franchisee shall be exempted from this chapter if the modification is offered on a voluntary basis and does not substantially and adversely impact the franchisee's rights, benefits, privileges, duties, obligations, or responsibilities under the franchise agreement.

(f) A franchisor shall not make modifications in consecutive years for the purpose of evading the 25 percent requirements set forth above.

If a franchisor in California keeps less than 25% of former California franchisees (not nationwide franchisees), per year, under a Gag order, there is no violation.  The modification agreement can have a clause in the document stating that it was "signed voluntarily".

Part 3 of this code describes Fraudulent and Prohibited Practices.  Chapter 1 describes Fraudulent practices.  Chapter 2 describes Prohibited practices.  Chapter 3 describes Unfair practices.

Indiana 
In Indiana fraud, deceit, and misrepresentation during the process of franchise contract formation or performance is actionable at civil law under the Indiana Franchise Act.  There is no general right of action, only a specific right of private action by a party on the aforementioned grounds.  The scope of franchise fraud is also narrower than the scope of ordinary common law fraud action.  The Indiana Supreme Court holds that "the circumstances of fraud would be the time, the place, the substance of the false representations, the facts mispresented, and the identification of what was procured by the fraud. [… However,] the plaintiff in a franchise fraud action must nevertheless plead the facts and circumstances alleged to constitute fraud, deceit, or misrepresentation with at least the same degree of particularity and detail as would be necessary to maintain an action for common law fraud".

Also held by the Supreme Court is that scienter is not an element of franchise fraud.  Nor does failure to disclose on the part of a franchisor a pending civil lawsuit at the time of making a franchise agreement constitute franchise fraud, so long as any such representations as to legal action are not relied upon by either party as part of their decision-making process.  Statements by the franchisor as to potential earnings by the franchisee do not constitute franchise fraud, since they do not constitute a material (mis-)representation of past or existing facts.

Civil action under the Franchise Disclosure Act must be brought within three years of discovery of the violation.  Action brought under the Deceptive Franchise Practices Act must be brought within two.

See also 
American Association of Franchisees and Dealers
Franchise termination
Censorship
Chilling effect (law)
Fear mongering
Franchise Disclosure Document
Franchising
Rollovers as Business Start-Ups
The Franchise Rule
Frivolous litigation
Legal threat
SLAPP
U.S. Securities and Exchange Commission

References

Bibliography

Further reading

Books and papers

Newspapers
 
 
 
 
 

Franchising
Pyramid and Ponzi schemes
Corporate crime